The 2000–01 St. Louis Blues season was the 34th for the franchise in St. Louis, Missouri. After winning the Presidents' Trophy the previous season, the Blues finished the regular-season with a record of 43 wins, 22 losses, 12 ties and 5 overtime losses, enough for 103 points and a trip to the 2001 Stanley Cup playoffs. In the Western Conference Quarterfinals, the Blues defeated the San Jose Sharks in six games, then swept the Pacific Division-winning Dallas Stars in the Conference Semifinals before losing in five games to the eventual Stanley Cup champion Colorado Avalanche in the Conference Finals.

Off-season

Regular season

Final standings

Schedule and results

Playoffs

Player statistics

Regular season
Scoring

Goaltending

Playoffs
Scoring

Goaltending

Awards and records

Transactions
May 5, 2001: Greg Davis was signed as a free agent.

Draft picks
St. Louis's draft picks at the 2000 NHL Entry Draft held at the Pengrowth Saddledome in Calgary, Alberta.

See also
2000–01 NHL season

References

St. Louis
St. Louis
St. Louis Blues seasons
St
St